Renato de Grandis (24 October 1927 – 2 December 2008) was an Italian composer, musicologist, writer and Theosophist.

Biography 

Renato de Grandis was born in 1927 in Venice. He studied piano, conducting, composition, and musicology in Conservatorio di Musica Benedetto Marcello di Venezia. Among his teachers were famous musicians Gian Francesco Malipiero and Bruno Maderna.

Music 
In 1945, Renato, being an eighteen-year-old student, won the first prize in a composition competition organized by the Italian radio, and in 1953 he had the first national award of Italy for composition. In 1959, he settled in Darmstadt, where he lived for about twenty years, then lived in Brussels. He wrote 2 operas, 4 symphonies, 12 sonatas for piano, and other works. De Grandis was an outstanding but atypical figure in the context of avant-garde music of the late 20th century. Frankfurter Allgemeine Zeitung called him an "avant-garde outsider," while the music encyclopedia MGG (1st edition) wrote that "he pointed the way in European musical theater for decades." He was considered one of the most significant European avant-garde composers. His music was being performed in Darmstadt, Dortmund, Cologne, Kiel, Hanover, Munich, Stuttgart, Wiesbaden, Brussels, Warsaw, Dublin.

Theosophy 
In 1987, de Grandis decided to abandon the composition and, returning to Italy, engaged in philosophy, poetry, painting, and teaching. He became interested in research in Kabbalah, Buddhism, and Theosophy. During the 1980s, he traveled a lot, especially in southern India.

Prof. Joscelyn Godwin noted that de Grandis was "an active member of the Italian Section" of the Theosophical Society. He was the founder of the International Center for the Theosophical Research in Cervignano del Friuli, which continues to work successfully to this day. He wrote books such as Teosofia di base, Teosofia contemporanea, Theos-Sophia, Abhidharma e Psicologie Occidentali, in addition, he published comments to the Book of Dzyan and The Voice of the Silence by Helena Blavatsky.

Works

Compositions 

 Etudes for flute and piano (1960)
 Canti sulle pause (1961)
 Toccata a doppio coro figurato per due pianoforti (1965)
 Salterio populare, 1 (1968)
 Salterio populare, 2 (1969)
 Second serenade, for solo cello (1970)
 Eduard und Kunegunde (1971)
 Rosenkreuzer-Sonate, seventh piano sonata (1972)
 Preludio ai poemi di Dzyan, for large orchestra (1973)
 Zweite Rosenkreuzer-Sonate, eighth piano sonata (1976)
 Memory of the World: symphonic readings from an unknown archive (1976)
 Memory of the Fire (1983)
 Movimento perpetuo, preludes for piano (1998–2002)

Discography 
 Movimento perpetuo (2013), Antonio Tarallo, piano

Books and articles 
 Teosofia contemporanea
 Teosofia di base
 Theos-Sophia
 Abhidharma e Psicologie Occidentali
 Le Stanze di Dzyan, commentary
 La Voce del Silenzio, commentary
 "Son, musique, creatio"

Notes

References

Sources

External links 
 List of the journal publications by/about Renato de Grandis

1927 births
2008 deaths
20th-century Italian composers
21st-century Italian composers
20th-century Italian male writers
20th-century Italian non-fiction writers
21st-century Italian non-fiction writers
Italian musicologists
Italian Theosophists